Louis "Babe" Pressley (1916-1965) was an American professional basketball player. He played in the National Basketball League for the Chicago Studebaker Flyers. He was also a long-time player for the Harlem Globetrotters.  Pressley signed with the Globetrotters in 1937 until  1958. Pressley was key in double teaming George Mikan, when the Globetrotters beat the Lakers.  He was inducted into the Cleveland Hall of Fame in 1976. Pressley was recognized as an athletic great in an article concerning Abe Saperstein.

References

1916 births
1965 deaths
American men's basketball players
Basketball players from Cleveland
Chicago Studebaker Flyers players
Guards (basketball)
Harlem Globetrotters players